Charles Hodogbey (born July 21, 1948) is an ICT Specialist and politician of the Republic of Ghana. He was the member of parliament that represented  North Tongu (Ghana parliament constituency) Volta Region under the ticket of the National Democratic Congress in the 5th Parliament of the 4th Republic of Ghana.

Early life and education 
Charles Hodogbey was born in Dofor-Adidome in the Volta Region of Ghana. He was educated in the U.S. He holds a master's degree in management information systems from the De Paul University of Chicago in 1985.

Personal life 
He is married (with four children) and is a Christian (Evangelical Presbyterian).

Career 
He worked with the Department of Public Health, City of Chicago, U.S., as a principal programmer/analyst before he became a member of parliament for North Tongu.

Politics 
Charles Hodogbey is a member of the National Democratic Congress. He was a member of Ghana's parliament for North Tongu Constituency from 2009 up till 2013. He won with 22,876 votes out of the 29,116 valid votes cast = 78.6%.

References

Living people
National Democratic Congress (Ghana) politicians
Ghanaian MPs 2009–2013
1948 births